Andreas Nicklasson (born 22 April 1978) is a retired Swedish football midfielder.

References

1978 births
Living people
Swedish footballers
IF Elfsborg players
Västra Frölunda IF players
Jönköpings Södra IF players
Association football midfielders
Allsvenskan players